The Corruptor is a 1999 American action film directed by James Foley, starring Chow Yun-fat and Mark Wahlberg. The film was released in the United States on March 12, 1999.

Plot
NYPD Lieutenant Nick Chen is head of the Asian Gang Unit. His job is to keep the peace in Chinatown from a turf war that has broken out between the Tung Fung Benevolent Association tong and the Fukienese Dragons street gang. The problem is complicated by the fact that he is also an informant for the Tongs under Uncle Benny Wong and his lieutenant Henry Lee. After a bombing in Chinatown, Chen is reluctantly teamed up with Danny Wallace, who is unaware of Chen's corruption. Danny was also secretly tasked by Internal Affairs to monitor Chen. Danny lied to Chen and the Asian Gang Unit by claiming that he took the job as a means to quickly gain his detective shield.

During a police raid on a Fukienese whorehouse, Chen saves Wallace's life. Wallace, knowing that his life is now in Chen's hands, initiates a bust on a drug operation, not knowing that an undercover FBI agent was involved. After being berated by the FBI for interfering with an ongoing investigation, Wallace is introduced to Lee. Lee discusses the potential value of having another cop in the AGU on the Tong payroll, which Uncle Benny allows. Benny is able to lure Wallace into working for him by tipping him off to an underground prostitution ring. Wallace is given a commendation for valor, but Chen now suspects that Wallace is working for the Tongs.

Wallace and Chen inadvertently cross paths, throwing their initial trust for each other out the window and putting the intentions of Lee into question. Chen hates the Fukienese, but neither he nor Danny know that Lee is forming a partnership with their leader Bobby Vu. Both Lee and Vu know that there is an FBI agent undercover in their drug operation and decide to kill him.

While monitoring a drug operation, Wallace and Chen witness a violent confrontation with a Tong hit squad that leads to Chen getting berated for botching the FBI investigation. After the incident, both Wallace and Chen swear not to talk to the FBI without talking to each other first. The FBI finds out Wallace's real reason for joining the AGU and threaten to expose him unless he is willing to spy on Chen. When one of Chen's informants witnesses Vu's assassination of Uncle Benny, Chen alerts the DA, who intends to indict the Tongs under RICO. The DA, the FBI, and both Wallace and Chen decide that they want to catch Vu in the act and decide to hold off on the arrests.

Lee chooses to alert Chen of Wallace's real identity and job. During the nighttime operation, Chen draws his gun on Wallace in anger. Wallace reasons with Chen and the two fight the Dragons, killing most of them. Chen pushes Wallace out of the way and is fatally shot by Vu. Wallace then shoots Vu. While at the hospital, Wallace refuses to withdraw his original statement that Chen died a good cop. Later, Wallace leads the arrest of Lee. Chen is then given a hero's funeral with Wallace in the procession.

Cast

 Chow Yun-fat as Lieutenant Nick Chen
 Mark Wahlberg as Detective Danny Wallace
 Byron Mann as Bobby Vu
 Jon Kit Lee as Jack
 Kim Chan as Benny 'Uncle Benny' Wong
 Ric Young as Henry Lee
 Paul Ben-Victor as FBI Agent Pete Schabacker
 Bill MacDonald as Internal Affairs Captain Vince Kirkpatrick
 Elizabeth Lindsey as Detective Louise Deng
 Andrew Pang as Detective Willy Ung
 Brian Cox as Sean Wallace
 Tovah Feldshuh as US Attorney Margaret Wheeler
 Beau Starr as Captain Stan Klein
 Mark Williams as Co-Captain
 Susie Trinh as Amy San
 Olivia Yap as Tai
 Lynda Chiu as Kim
 Marie Matiko as May
 Pak-Kwong Ho as Phan Ho
 Chuck Scarborough as himself 
 Ayumi Iizuka as Bobby Vu's Girlfriend (uncredited)

Reception

Critical reception
The movie received mixed reviews from critics and audience. It currently has the ranking of 49% on Rotten Tomatoes with a critic consensus that reads "This uninspiring cop thriller doesn't measure up to Chow Yun-Fat's Hong Kong work."  Audiences polled by CinemaScore gave the film an average grade of "C+" on an A+ to F scale.

Roger Ebert of the Chicago Sun-Times said, "Even when it's transplanted to the streets of New York's Chinatown, as The Corruptor is, the Hong Kong action genre has certain obligatory requirements. Low-angle shots of bad guys looming over the camera, for example. And the sound of a metallic whoosh when there's a quick cut from one scene to the next. And what seems like more dialogue during action scenes than before and after them.... Director James Foley is obviously not right for this material. It's a shame, actually, that he's even working in the genre, since his gift is with the intense study of human behavior..."

Box office
The Corruptor grossed a total of $24,493,693 worldwide, including $15,164,492 in the United States and $9,329,109 in other territories.

Soundtrack

The soundtrack of The Corruptor features underground hip hop songs by artists including Mobb Deep, Spice 1 and Mystikal. The original score for The Corruptor contains music composed by Carter Burwell.

References

External links
 
 
 
 
 

1999 films
1999 action thriller films
1999 crime thriller films
1990s buddy cop films
American action thriller films
American crime thriller films
American buddy cop films
American police detective films
Action films about Asian Americans
Buddy drama films
Films about Chinese Americans
Films about the New York City Police Department
Films about corruption in the United States
Films about police corruption
Films directed by James Foley
Films scored by Carter Burwell
Films set in New York City
Films shot in Toronto
New Line Cinema films
Triad films
Chinese-language American films
1990s English-language films
1990s American films
1990s Hong Kong films